Nandurais a city which situated in Maharashtra. It is the headquarters of Nandura taluka and is situated on the National Highway No. 6 and the Mumbai-Howrah railway line. Nandura is an important city in the Buldhana district. The municipality of Nandura was established during the British Raj in 1931.
Nandura is famous for 'Khawa' (condensed milk). The place is major supplier of milk products to all nearby area.

History
According to 'Mahagovind Sutant' a Buddhist novel, Nandura was established in ancient time. It was capital of 'Assak' kingdom (one of the 16 ancient kingdoms (Mahajanpad) in ancient India (2600 B.C.). Nandura was called as 'Potan' at that time.

According to Ain-e-Akbari, Nandura was an integral part of Gulshan-e-Berar in the Medieval era, beginning in the Khilji dynasty until the Mughal era.
The city remembers various rulers, Saints (Sant) of Maharashtra who ruled on the land and the heart of the people of Nandura.
Various links to Peshwas, Peshwe or Peshwa are also found in the history of Nandura.
Nawab Amirullah Khan was one of the Nawabs in the late 1800 AD history of Nandura. It relates to Nizams of Deccan also known as Dakkan. When the British invaded India, Nawab's rule ceased. Nandura was under jurisdiction of Akola district. After August 1905, it became the part of Buldhana district.
In 2007 the municipal elections of Nandura Mohammad Irfan and sudhir parlhad murehkar made the government in Nandura municipal council in history of Nandura Mohammad Irfan was first person from Muslim community who had won election from two seats in Nandura.

Geography
 
Nandura was a twin city; Nandura Budruk (Greater Nandura) is separated from the original village of the same name, Nandura Khurd (Little Nandura) by the Dnyanganga River, though the village is officially considered as the part of Nandura itself.actually Nandura get extended by another 5 small villages named as Ahamadpur, Mahamadpur, Peth, Khudavantpur, New Jigaon  and Rasulpur. So now its become bigger city with Jigaon Project as one of the bigger dam so around 20 villages which are affected by this project totally depend upon this city and making it as bigger trade hub. City get expanded towards Nimgaon in North,Wadi in west,Aamsari in east and Kolamba in South. It is trading hub of goods majorly Cotton,Red Onion,Chilli,Lemon and Khava(Mava). It connected by Rail network Mumbai-Kolkata and Nation Highway NH6 which is also Asian Highway AH46 it is 6 lane Asian Highway. Nandura has a 105 feet tall statue of Lord Hanuman biggest Hanuman statue in the world and a historical place named Ambadevigad.

Demographics
 India census, Nandura had a population of nearly 37469. The gender ratio of males to females was 51:49. Nandura had a literacy rate of 69%, higher than the national average of 59.5%: male literacy is 76%, and female literacy is 62%. A total of 14% of the population were under 6 years of age.

Transport
Nandura is situated on national highway number 6 i.e. Hajira-Dhule-Kolkata National Highway.  It is also a railway station of Central Railway on the Howrah-Nagpur-Mumbai line.

Economy
Nandura has oil mills, dal mills, and joining & pressing industry along with handlooms.  In older days, Nandura was known for cotton products like ropes, handmade cotton dhoti, and saris, etc. Nandura's milk products like Khava are famous for its quality and taste and is transported daily to several adjoining districts.

Nandura also acts an important trade center in the region. Prominent goods traded include wheat, jowar, pulses, cotton, onion, chili, lemon and several vegetables like Brinjal.

Nandura tehsil
Nandura tehsil is part of Malkapur Sub-Division of Buldhana district, along with Motala and Malkapur tehsils.
It has its borders with Malkapur tehsil in the west, Jalgaon Jamod tehsil in the north, Khamgaon and Shegaon tehsils in the east, and Khamgaon and Motala tehsils in the south. Nandura tehsil has an area of 462 square km and consisting of 103 villages with a population of around 1,98,000.

Some of these villages are Chandur Biswa, Wadner, Nimgaon, Takli (Wachpal), Jigaon, Palsoda, Patonda, Mamulwadi, Higana Gavhad, Mominabad, Sawargaon, Sirsodi, Yerali, Belad (Sabe), Alampur, Narakhed, Pimpalkhuta Dhande, Rasulpur, Wadali, Dighi, Khumgaon, Dahigaon, Matoda, sonaj, Danora, Kati, Dahivadi, Potali, Medhali, Wadi, Shegaon, Lonwadi, Malegaon Gond, Wasadi, Khadatgaon, Mahalundi, Jawala Bazar, Takarkhed, Fuli, Khaira, and Shemba, Pimpri Adhao, Kokalwadi, Dighi Wadgaon, Vitali, Nimbola

Hanuman statue

The 105-feet statue of Lord Hanuman is the main tourist attraction in the town . It is one of the highest Hanuman statues in India. Fourth along with Hanuman Murti located in Shahjahanpur, Uttar Pradesh. It is also mentioned in Limca Book of Records.  It is situated on the national highway no. 6. Lord Hanuman is the son of Pawan (Air) and Anjani (the woman of highly spiritual native). Lord Hanuman is called Pawansut (Son of Air) and Anjaniputra (Son of Anjani). 
About Murti :
Height:105 ft.
Chest girth:70 ft.
Base:30 ft.
Tail:70 ft.
Arm:25 ft.
Mace 30 ft.
Sole 34 ft.
Nail of sole:15 ft.

References

Talukas in Maharashtra
Cities and towns in Buldhana district